was a multi-use stadium in Kobe, Japan. Opened in 1970 and with a capacity of 13,000 spectators, it was built on the site of the former Kobe Keirin Stadium and was the first stadium in Japan that was custom-built with a rectangular field for ball sports such as rugby and soccer and with lighting for night matches. It was one of the venues of the 1979 FIFA World Youth Championship and was a home stadium of Vissel Kobe. It was demolished and replaced by Misaki Park Stadium, which commenced construction in 1999 and was completed in 2001 in order to host the 2002 FIFA World Cup.

External links
 Stadium information

Defunct football venues in Japan
Sports venues in Hyōgo Prefecture
Buildings and structures in Kobe
Vissel Kobe
Sports venues completed in 1970
Sports venues demolished in 1999
Demolished buildings and structures in Japan
1970 establishments in Japan
1999 disestablishments in Japan